Invocation of Magick is the ninth album by Runemagick. It was released in 2006 on Aftermath Music

Track listing
 "Preludium Apocalypsis" – 4:47 
 "Invocation of Doom Runes" – 10:35 
 "Black Magick Sorceress" – 14:12 
 "Fisher of Souls" – 10:28 
 "Lower Worlds" – 1:02 
 "The Devils (Imperium Magnum Infernalis)" – 9:29 
 "Conjuration of the Black Shape"  – 7:00 
 "Witchcraft Gateways" – 12:22

Tracks 7 and 8 are bonus songs on the digipak edition.

Credits
 Nicklas "Terror" Rudolfsson - Vocals, Guitar
 Emma Karlsson - Bass
 Daniel Moilanen - Drums

Runemagick albums
2006 albums